Blassingame is a surname. Notable people with the surname include:

 Jerel Blassingame (born 1981), American professional basketball player
 John Wesley Blassingame (1940–2000), American historian and writer
 Lurton Blassingame (1904–1988), American literary agent
 Tia Blassingame (born 1971), American artist
 William Blassingame (born 1836), American politician 
 Wyatt Rainey Blassingame (1909–1985), American author